Temptation is the debut studio album by German girl band Monrose. It was released by Starwatch Music in association with Cheyenne Records and Warner Music Group on 8 December 2006 in German-speaking Europe, following the band's formation on Popstars – Neue Engel braucht das Land, the television talent show's fifth season. Pre-recorded with all six Popstars finalists throughout October and November 2006, jury member Dieter Falk produced the majority of the album and collaborated with producers like Jiant, Marcus Brosch, Jonas Jeberg, Toni Cottura and Marc Mozart and his Mozart & Friends team. The album is primarily a dance-pop record with influences from many the hip hop, contemporary R&B, and Europop genres.

One of the most successful debuts of the year, the album debuted on top of the charts in Austria, Germany and Switzerland, and was certified platinum for more than 200,000 copies sold within its first week of release. By June 2007, Temptation had reached triple platinum status for more than 400,000 copies sold. With the number-one hit single "Shame" and the ballad "Even Heaven Cries", the album spawned two singles.

Recording 
In late October 2006 the six remaining finalists of the fifth installment of Popstars entered the recording studios for a total of three weeks to start working on alternate versions of the band's future debut album with judge Dieter Falk and his production team. While Falk and British duo Jiant contributed most to the album, the contestants also worked with producers Bobbybass, Marcus Brosch, Toni Cottura, Jonas Jeberg, Marc Mozart, Major, J remy, Snowflakers, Derek von Krogh and J. Worthy, and songwriters Edwin "Lil' Eddie" Serrano, Gary Barlow, Claude-Michel Schönberg and Alain Boublil.

Critical reception

Media reception for Temptation was generally positive. In his review for laut.de, Stefan Johannesberg praised Monrose for their authentic musical middle ground and  called the trio the "new Destiny's Dolls or Pussycat Childs." He wrote that "the three voices and their hearts and souls are two of the most important components on this good album. Games, fun and sex squirt out of every reel, because R&B music is exactly their sound." Johannesberg further complimented the vocal performances on Temptation: "Senna and Bahar torch the clubs sometimes aggressively, sometimes frivolously" while Mandy's "monster of a voice gets goosebumps vibrating in the best X-Tina or Mariah manner."

Albert Ranner from CDStarts called Temptation a "wasted chance" as well as "a declaration of bankruptcy in which the three girls are sold below their value." He found that the album was an "unnecessary disparagement of the authenticity of the trio [...]  mainly due to heavy copying of American R&B artists such as Christina Milian, Jennifer Lopez or the work of a younger Mariah Carey." LetMeEntertainYou wrote that "if you let them, the girls can sing quite well. But with average pop songs like "No," "Work It" and "Live Life Get By," however, this becomes an absolutely secondary matter. Pointer felt that "Monrose's music is authentic and trendy with a sound reminiscent of the Sugababes."

Chart performance
Following its physical release, Temptation immediately debuted at number-one of the albums charts in Austria, Germany and Switzerland, making it one of the most successful debuts of the year. The album was instantly certified platinum for more than 200,000 copies sold within its first week of release, and as of June 2007, has been certified three-time platinum for more than 400,000 copies sold worldwide. It was eventually ranked 17th on the German Media Control year-end charts.

Although "Do That Dance" was planned to be released as the album's third single at times, Temptation has spawned two singles only: The album's lead single, "Shame", reached number-one in Austria, Germany, Luxembourg and Switzerland, making it one of the most successful debuts of the year. Outselling 3/4 of the German Top 100's singles sales combined, the song also emerged as the fastest selling CD single of 2006 and the biggest downloaded song since 2004. Follow-up single "Even Heaven Cries" was released in early March 2007 and moreover used as the band's competition song in the Eurovision Song Contest 2007 pre-selection show Deutscher Vorentscheid 2007. While it reached the top 10 in Germany, the song also peaked within the top 20 in Austria, and Switzerland.

Track listing

'Notes
 denotes co-producer
 denotes additional producer
Sample credits
"Oh La la" is a cover version of the same-titled 2005 song by British duo Boo2.
"Do That Dance" is an English remake of Kay Cee Dee's 2006 song "Bad Boy."
"Push Up on Me" is a cover version of Thara and Rupee's previously unreleased recording from 2006.

Credits and personnel
Credits adapted from the liner notes of Temptation.

Performers and musicians

 Dieter Falk – piano
 Marc Mozart – keyboard
 G-Strings – strings
 Ossi Schaller – guitar

Technical

 Christian Ballard – mixing
 Bobbybass – producer
 Marcus Brosch – producer, programming
 Copenhaniacs – programming
 Toni Cottura – producer
 Tom Dokoupil – engineer
 Dieter Falk – producer
 Tara Harrison – vocal assistance
 Tim Hawes – mixing
 Pete Kirtley – mixing
 Sven Kohlwage – mixing
 Derek von Krogh – mixing, producer, programming
 Jonas Jeberg – mixing, producer
 Jiant – producer
 Major – producer
 Obi Mhondera – vocal assistance
 Mark Mozart – producer, programming
 J. Remy – producer
 Niara Scarlett – vocal assistance
 Snowflakers – producer
 Ren Swan – mixing
 Christoph Terbuyken – engineer
 J. Worthy – producer, programming

Charts

Weekly charts

Year-end charts

Certifications and sales

Release history

References

External links
 

2006 debut albums
Monrose albums
Warner Music Group albums